Claire Mathieu (formerly Kenyon, born 1965) is a French computer scientist and mathematician, known for her research on approximation algorithms, online algorithms, and auction theory. She works as a director of research at the Centre national de la recherche scientifique.

Mathieu earned her Ph.D. in 1988 from the University of Paris-Sud, under the supervision of Claude Puech. She worked at CNRS and ENS Lyon from 1991 to 1997, at Paris-Sud from 1997 to 2002, at the École Polytechnique from 2002 to 2004, and at Brown University from 2004 to 2011 before returning to CNRS in 2012.

She was an invited speaker at the 2014 International Colloquium on Automata, Languages and Programming and at the 2015 Symposium on Discrete Algorithms. She won the CNRS Silver Medal in 2019.  In 2020, she became a Chevalier of the Légion d'honneur.

References

1965 births
Living people
French computer scientists
Theoretical computer scientists
French mathematicians
French women computer scientists
French women mathematicians
Brown University faculty
Academic staff of École Polytechnique
Research directors of the French National Centre for Scientific Research